Hautamäki is a Finnish surname. Notable people with the surname include:

Erkki Hautamäki (born 1930), Finnish historian
Juha Hautamäki (born 1982), Finnish motorcycle speedway rider
Jussi Hautamäki (born 1979), Finnish ski jumper
Matti Hautamäki (born 1981), Finnish ski jumper

Finnish-language surnames